The 1896 Michigan Agricultural Aggies football team represented Michigan Agricultural College (MAC) in the 1896 college football season. The Aggies compiled a 1–2–1 record. Although teams representing MAC had played two games against nearby Alma College a decade earlier in 1886, the 1896 season was the first in which MAC fielded a varsity football team for a full season of play.

The team opened the season with a 10–0 victory over Lansing High School on September 26. The Aggies then played  to a scoreless tie on October 25, before closing its season with an 18–16 loss to Alma on November 11. The 1896 Aggies had no coach.

Schedule

References

Michigan Agricultural
Michigan State Spartans football seasons
Michigan Agricultural Aggies football